Ursula Vian-Kübler (6 September 1928 – 18 January 2010) was a Swiss ballerina and actress.

Biography 
Ursula Kübler was born on 6 September 1928 in Zürich, Switzerland, to Alva Giertz and Arnold Kübler. She joined the Oper Zürich as a dancer. After a career as a dancer at the opera, she danced for Maurice Béjart, before becoming a company member at the Paris Opera Ballet.

After retiring from ballet, Kübler worked as a film, stage, and television actress.

She met Boris Vian at a cocktail party at Gallimard in 1950, and the two started an affair. Vian later divorced his wife, and Kübler married him on 8 February 1954. In 1963, she founded the Boris Vian Association, which was renamed the Boris Vian Foundation in 1981. 

In 1971, she signed the Manifesto of the 343, a petition created as an act of civil disobedience arguing for the legalization of abortion in France.

She died on 18 January 2010 in Eus, France.

References 

1928 births
2010 deaths
Paris Opera Ballet dancers
Abortion-rights activists
Swiss ballerinas
Swiss film actresses
Swiss stage actresses
Swiss television actresses
Actors from Zürich
Signatories of the 1971 Manifesto of the 343